The Hays House is an historic Greek Revival house near  Lorman, Mississippi. It was listed on the National Register of Historic Places on March 10, 2009. The Hays House is one of a few Greek Revival cottages in Mississippi to have a "full-façade gallery". The property was the Highlighted Property of the Week when the National Park Service released its weekly list of March 20, 2009.

References

Houses completed in 1858
Houses on the National Register of Historic Places in Mississippi
Houses in Jefferson County, Mississippi
Greek Revival houses in Mississippi
National Register of Historic Places in Jefferson County, Mississippi